The white-throated sparrow (Zonotrichia albicollis) is a passerine bird of the New World sparrow family Passerellidae.

Etymology

Description
The white-throated sparrow is a passerine bird of the New World sparrow family Passerellidae. They are similar in appearance to the white-crowned sparrow, but with white throat markings and yellow lores.

There are two adult plumage variations known as the tan-striped and white-striped forms. On the white-striped form the crown is black with a white central stripe. The supercilium is white as well. The auriculars are gray with the upper edge forming a black eye line.

On the tan form, the crown is dark brown with a tan central stripe. The supercilium is tan as well. The auriculars are gray/light brown with the upper edge forming a brown eye line. Both variations feature dark eyes, a white throat, yellow lores and gray bill. There is variation and some individuals may show dark lateral stripes of each side of the throat.

They almost always pair with the opposite color morph for breeding. The two color morphs occur in approximately equal numbers. Both male and female white-striped birds are more aggressive than tan-striped birds during the breeding season. The aggression is because of high level of estrogen receptor alpha in white-striped birds. 

The breast has gray/tan streaks and the streaks continue down the flanks but the belly is generally light gray. The wings are rufous with two distinct white wing bars. Sexes are morphologically similar.

Behavior

Reproduction
White-throated sparrows breed in central Canada and New England. They nest either on the ground under shrubs or low in trees in deciduous or mixed forest areas and lay three to five brown-marked blue or green-white eggs.

The tan and white morphs of white-throated sparrows use different reproductive strategies. Tan males invest in parental care and guard their mates from others searching for extra pair copulations (EPCs). White males invest in securing additional mates and EPCs through song advertisement and intruding into neighboring territory. Female morphs have similar differences, where tan females invest in parental care and white females solicit EPCs and engage in brood parasitism, leaving their eggs in another's nest to be raised and fed. Mating with the opposite morphs and using alternative reproductive strategies helps maintain competitive equilibrium. This behaviour has been described genetically to follow from the chromosomal inversion of a supergene which acts as an extra pair of sex-determining genes, resulting in four phenotypes that reproduce in a disassortative mating pattern.

Wintering and migration
In winter, this species migrates to the southern and eastern United States. They are differential migrants with females migrating farther, increasing the proportion of females at lower latitudes in the Atlantic flyway. Females are smaller so they would not perform as optimally at colder, higher latitudes, and females avoid competition with the dominant males of the winter hierarchies by migrating farther. There is also no benefit for females to be among the first to return after winter, so migrating farther allows the males to return and establish territory a few weeks before their arrival. It stays year round in the Atlantic provinces of Canada. This bird is a rare vagrant to western Europe. Alongside some other species such as the cardinal, dark-eyed junco, song sparrow and chickadees, this species ranks among the most abundant native birds during winter in eastern North America.

Despite a high level of con-specific rivalry within white-throated sparrows, this species is often dominated by other seed-eating winter residents, even those that are no larger than itself like the song sparrow, and thus may endure high levels of predation while foraging since restricted to sub-optimal sites at times by competition. Not to mention numerous mammalian carnivores, at least ten avian predators often hunt them and they are among the most regular prey species for some smaller raptors, i.e. the sharp-shinned hawk and eastern screech-owl.

Diet
These birds forage on the ground under or near thickets or in low vegetation. They mainly eat seeds, insects and berries, and are attracted to bird feeders.

Song and calls

White-throated sparrows produce song laterally through the left side of their syrinx, and control of their syrinx involves both their central and peripheral nervous systems. After damage to motor control of the left side of the syrinx, individuals were still able to produce sound but their song pattern was distorted, indicating the left side chiefly controls their production of song. There are at least two distinct songs sung by this species. One consists of an initial note, followed by three or so repeated notes at an interval of about a major third above. The second song consists of an initial note, a second a whole step lower, and a third note, repeated two or three times, about a minor third below that. This second song is commonly described by use of mnemonics with the cadence of "Po-or Sam Peabody, Peabody, Peabody" (or "O-oh sweet Canada, Canada, Canada") The rhythm is very regular, and the timbre could be described as pinched. These musical intervals are only approximate; to a human ear the song often sounds out of tune. The repeated note will often change in pitch very slightly, contributing to this effect.

As reported by National Geographic in 2020, ornithologists have discovered a new song for the white-throated sparrow. This bird song begins in the same way as the typical song, but with a subtle difference: the repeating triplets, as in "Peabody", become doublets, as in "Cherry", ending with a final single tone. This new tune began to appear in British Columbia, Canada, and then spread east.

The white-throated sparrow also has at least two calls, in addition to its song.

Footnotes

External links

White-throated sparrow – Smithsonian Migratory Bird Center
White-throated sparrow species account – Cornell Lab of Ornithology
White-throated sparrow – Zonotrichia albicollis – USGS Patuxent Bird Identification InfoCenter
Stamps at bird-stamps.org
 
 

white-throated sparrow
Birds of Canada
Native birds of the Northeastern United States
white-throated sparrow
white-throated sparrow
Extant Late Pleistocene first appearances